Tünde Szabó (born May 31, 1974, in Nyíregyháza, Szabolcs-Szatmár-Bereg) is a Hungarian retired female swimmer and politician.

Aged eighteen she won a silver medal at the 1992 Summer Olympics in Barcelona, one at the 1991 World Championships in Perth, and two at the 1991 European Championships in Athens. On each occasion she finished second behind fellow Hungarian swimmer, Krisztina Egerszegi.

Political career
Szabó was appointed Secretary of State for Sports by minister Zoltán Balog in September 2015, replacing István Simicskó, who became Minister of Defence. She retained her position until 2022, when the secretariat was drew under the portfolio of the Ministry of Defence.

As a candidate of the ruling party Fidesz, Szabó was elected a Member of Parliament for Nyíregyháza (Szabolcs-Szatmár-Bereg County 1st constituency) in the 2018 Hungarian parliamentary election, defeating MSZP politician Judit Csabai. She was re-elected MP for Nyíregyháza in the 2022 parliamentary election. Following the formation of the Fifth Orbán Government, Minister Tibor Navracsics appointed her government commissioner responsible for the economic development of the Northern Great Plain in May 2022.

References

External links 
 
 

1974 births
Living people
Female backstroke swimmers
Olympic swimmers of Hungary
Swimmers at the 1992 Summer Olympics
Olympic silver medalists for Hungary
World Aquatics Championships medalists in swimming
European Aquatics Championships medalists in swimming
Medalists at the 1992 Summer Olympics
Olympic silver medalists in swimming
2000s Playboy Playmates
20th-century Hungarian lawyers
21st-century Hungarian women politicians
Members of the National Assembly of Hungary (2018–2022)
Members of the National Assembly of Hungary (2022–2026)